The 2005 1000 km of Istanbul was the fifth and final round of the 2005 Le Mans Series season, held at the Istanbul Park, Turkey. It was run on November 13, 2005. Pescarolo Sport won the qualifying and the race.

Official results

Class winners in bold.  Cars failing to complete 70% of winner's distance marked as Not Classified (NC).

† - #95 Racesport Peninsula TVR was listed as not classified due to failing to complete the final lap.

Statistics
 Pole Position - #17 Pescarolo Sport - 1:39.359
 Fastest Lap - #17 Pescarolo Sport - 1:51.813
 Average Speed - 153.255 km/h

References

 World Sports Racing Prototypes - 2005 1000 km of Istanbul results

I
2005 in Turkish motorsport